Vasilios Efthymiou (born 17 March 1999) is a Greek professional footballer who plays as a winger for Super League 2 club Proodeftiki.

References

1999 births
Living people
Greek footballers
Greece youth international footballers
Super League Greece 2 players
Trikala F.C. players
Association football wingers
Footballers from Preveza